Sepia dollfusi is a species of cuttlefish native to the Red Sea and southern part of the Suez Canal. The depth range of S. dollfusi is unknown. It has been recorded once in the Egyptian sector of the Mediterranean Sea, so it is potentially a Lessepsian migrant into the Mediterranean via the Suez Canal.

Sepia dollfusi grows to a mantle length of 110 mm.

The type specimen was collected near Périm Island in the southern Red Sea. It is deposited at the Muséum National d'Histoire Naturelle in Paris. It is an important commercial species in the Suez Canal.

References

External links

Cuttlefish
Molluscs described in 1941